The 2003 Kangaroo Tour was a six-match tour by the Australia national rugby league team of France, Wales and England, and to date has been the last Kangaroo Tour.  The last three matches were all Tests against Great Britain for the Ashes. Coached by Chris Anderson and captained by Darren Lockyer, Australia continued its dominance, winning all of the three tests against Great Britain and retaining The Ashes that they have held since 1973 but the 3-0 scoreline didn't show how close the series really was as Australia had to come from behind to win every test, and won each match by a margin of no more than one converted try.

Touring squad
The Australian team was again coached by Chris Anderson who was making his 4th Kangaroo tour. As Gorden Tallis had retired from representative football a month before, the team was captained by the newly appointed Darren Lockyer.

 Darren Smith was added to the team while the tour was in England

Pre-Ashes matches

France XIII:  Julien Gerin, Dimitri Pilo, Sylvain Houles, Teddy Sadaoui, Frédéric Zitter, Frédéric Banquet, Julien Rinaldi, Olivier Pramil, Cederic Gay, Jérôme Guisset (c), Daniel Dumas, Jamal Fakir, John Vaigata. Res - Artie Shead, Pierre Sabatie, Abderazak El Khalouki, Marc Faumuina. Coach - Gilles Dumas

Australia:  Anthony Minichiello, Luke Lewis, Shannon Hegarty, Michael De Vere, Matt Sing, Craig Wing, Craig Gower, Petero Civoniceva, Michael Crocker, Robbie Kearns (c), Willie Mason, Trent Waterhouse, Phil Bailey. Res - Joel Clinton, Shane Webcke, Richard Villasanti, Brett Kimmorley

England A:  Shaun Briscoe, Mark Calderwood, Martin Gleeson, Martin Aspinwall, Ade Gardner, Chris Thorman, Rob Burrow, Andy Lynch, Matt Diskin, Rob Parker, Danny Tickle, Lee Radford, Sean O'Loughlin (c). Res - Danny McGuire, Mick Higham, Danny Sculthorpe, Gareth Hock. Coach - John Kear

Australia:  Darren Lockyer (c), Matt Sing, Shannon Hegarty, Michael De Vere, Luke Lewis, Craig Gower, Brett Kimmorley, Joel Clinton, Danny Buderus, Petero Civoniceva, Craig Fitzgibbon, Steve Simpson, Luke Ricketson. Res - Michael Crocker, Trent Waterhouse, Willie Mason, Robbie Kearns

Australia played a non-test international against Wales in Bridgend. The Kangaroos won 76-4, crossing for 11 tries.

Ashes series
Australia were to contest Great Britain for the Ashes for the last time in 2003 in what was styled the Think! Road Safety Test series. The Australian Rugby League and Rugby Football League agreed beforehand that the best-of-three series would be officiated by British referees Steve Ganson and Russell Smith for the 1st and 3rd tests, and by Australian referee Tim Mander for the 2nd test. The series was broadcast on television by Sky Sports with commentary by Eddie Hemmings, Mike Stephenson, Shaun McRae, Bill Arthur and Chris Warren. Australian McRae had actually toured with the 1990 Kangaroos as a team trainer.

1st Test

Great Britain kicked off and Australian front rower Robbie Kearns, taking the very first hit-up of the match was struck high by his opposite number Adrian Morley, who was promptly sent off, leaving his team to play the entire match with only twelve men. It was a record for the fastest ever sending off in rugby league history. In the eleventh minute Australia had reached the opposition's end of the field and after playing the ball right in front of the try line, Gower and Lockyer strung long passes together to get it out to the right wing where Phil Bailey dived over in the corner. The video referee David Campbell ruled that Bailey had grounded the ball before his feet were pulled into touch and he was awarded his first international try. With first choice goal-kicker Fitzgibbon taken from the field suffering concussion in the lead-up to the try, the conversion attempt was made by Gower who missed, so the Kangaroos led 0-4. Great Britain later got the ball down to Australia's end and equalised with a similar try, with international debutant Carney diving over in the right-hand corner just before the eighteen-minute mark. Sean Long's conversion attempt was also missed so the scores were level at 4-4.  In the thirty-first minute, the Australians had almost reached Great Britain's try line where on the fifth tackle Lockyer at first receiver put a short kick in behind the defense for Waterhouse to grab onto and fall over the line. The video referee was called upon to check for off-side but the try was awarded. Gower's second conversion attempt was also missed so Australia led 4-8 and this remained the score until half-time.

Nearly five minutes into the second half a brawl erupted between Brian Carney and Michael Crocker and in the aftermath Crocker was sent to the sin bin. A few minutes later, following a handling error by Lockyer close to the centre of his own try-line, Great Britain were awarded a scrum feed. From the scrum win the ball was moved out to left centre Keith Senior who dived over in the fiftieth minute to equalise the scores again. Long kicked the conversion successfully so the home side lead 10-8. This lead was extended with a penalty kick by Long making it 12-8. Australia later made their way down to Great Britain's end of the field and on the last tackle Brett Kimmorley from dummy-half ran up to the defensive line then threw a long cut out pass left to his halves partner Craig Gower to run through a gap and dive over the try-line untouched, equalising the score once again. With Fitzgibbon back on the field the conversion was successful so Australia were leading 12-14 with thirty minutes remaining. From the ensuing kick-off Gower knocked on and from the resulting possession right in front of Australia's try-line, Great Britain, after keeping the ball alive got it out to right winger Carney who dove over in the corner again. The video referee checked that the ball was put down properly before Carney's legs were pulled into touch and he was awarded the try, re-gaining the lead for Great Britain. Paul Deacon with his first conversion attempt for Great Britain kicked the goal from the sideline successfully, so the home side were leading 18-14 with less than ten minutes of the match remaining. Then in the seventy-fifth minute the Kangaroos were a few metres into Great Britain's half of the field and on the last tackle. They swung the ball out to the left where Craig Wing made a break and passed it back inside for Darren Lockyer coming up in support to run the remaining fifteen metres and score untouched under the posts. Fitzgibbon's conversion was successful so Australia were leading 18-20. When taking a goal-line drop out, Andy Farrell kicked it out on the full resulting in a penalty to Australia right in front of the uprights. Fitzgibbon kicked the goal in the final minute so the full-time score was 18-22.

2nd Test

For his high tackle in the 1st Test, Great Britain front rower Adrian Morley avoided suspension, only incurring a fine of £2,000 from a three-man international judiciary panel consisting of Queensland Rugby League chairman John McDonald, Rugby Football League representative Deryck Fox and chairman, Judge Peter Charlesworth.

3rd Test

Statistics
Leading Try Scorer
 3 by Darren Lockyer, Michael Crocker, Anthony Minichiello, Matt Sing and Brett Kimmorley

Leading Point Scorer
 58 by Craig Fitzgibbon (1 try, 27 goals)

Largest Attendance
 24,614 - First test vs Great Britain at JJB Stadium

Largest non-test Attendance
 7,813 - vs France XIII at Stade d'Albert Domec

References

External links
2003 Kangaroo Tour at rugbyleagueproject.org
2003 Kangaroo Tour at rl1908.com

Australia national rugby league team tours
Rugby league tours of Great Britain
Rugby league tours of France
Kangaroo tour of Great Britain and France
Kangaroo tour of Great Britain and France
Kangaroo tour of Great Britain and France
Kangaroo tour of Great Britain and France